Gibbons Creek Reservoir (sometimes referred to as Gibbons Creek Lake) is a power plant cooling reservoir on Gibbons Creek in the Navasota River basin, 20 miles (32 km) east of College Station, Texas, United States.  The dam and lake are managed by Texas Municipal Power Agency (TMPA), which uses the reservoir as a cooling pond for a coal-fired power plant generating electricity for the cities of Bryan, Denton, Garland, and Greenville (all of whom have municipality-owned electric companies).

The reservoir was officially impounded in 1981.

Gibbons Creek Reservoir is a popular recreational destination due to its location near the Bryan-College Station metropolitan area. The nearby power plant was mothballed indefinitely by TMPA in January 2019 due to the high cost of coal-powered electricity when compared to cheaper natural gas. TMPA had been trying to sell the plant since 2016.

Fish populations 
Gibbons Creek Reservoir has been stocked with species of fish intended to improve the utility of the reservoir for recreational fishing.  Fish present in Gibbons Creek Reservoir include largemouth bass, bluegill, catfish, Tilapia, white crappie, and black crappie.  The water has standing timber and aquatic vegetation but generally is rather turbid. Its shoreline is covered with native grasses mixed with oak, elm, and other East Texas hardwoods.

Recreational uses 
Boating and fishing are very popular.  The steam power plant on the southwest shore of the lake constantly pumps in warm water that keeps this lake a viable fishing spot year-round, even when other lakes in the area become too cold in the winter months.

Recreational fishing and other activities on this lake are regulated by the Texas Parks and Wildlife Department.

References

External links 
 Gibbons Creek Reservoir
 Texas Municipal Power Agency
 Gibbons Creek Reservoir - Texas Parks & Wildlife
 

Protected areas of Grimes County, Texas
Reservoirs in Texas
Bodies of water of Grimes County, Texas
Cooling ponds